This is a list of notable Americans of Canadian descent, including both original immigrants who obtained American citizenship and were the principal founders of the United States, and their American descendants.

Americans of Canadian descent

 Earl W. Bascom (1906–1995), rodeo pioneer, inventor, actor, cowboy artist/sculptor, sports hall of fame inductee, father was Canadian citizen
Drake Batherson (born 1998), ice hockey player
 Max Baucus (born 1941), politician, former long-time U.S. Senator from Montana (1978–2014), and former U.S. Ambassador to China (2014–2017)
 Warren Beatty (born 1937), actor and director
 Madonna (full name Madonna Louise Ciccone) (born 1958), singer-songwriter, dancer, actress, and businesswoman also known as "The Queen of Pop"
 Lady Gaga (born 1986), singer-songwriter, dancer, actress, and businesswoman also known as "The New Queen of Pop"
 Walter Chrysler (1875–1940), automotive industry executive and founder of the Chrysler Corporation
 Stephen Curry, basketball player
 Ayesha Curry, actress and television personality
 Roy Edward Disney (1930–2009), Walt Disney Company executive
 Walt Disney (1901–1966), animator
 Will Durant (1885–1981), historian and philosopher
 Thomas Edison (1847–1931), inventor
 Alina Foley (born 2003), child actress known for her role as Leah in Shimmer and Shine; daughter of Dave Foley
 Marcus Foligno (born 1991), ice hockey player
 Nick Foligno (born 1987), ice hockey player; older brother of Marcus Foligno
 Jorja Fox (born 1968), actress
 Freddie Freeman (born 1989), baseball first baseman
 Missy Franklin (born 1995), Olympic gold medal-winning swimmer
 Brendan Fraser (born 1968), film and stage actor
 Kenny G (born 1956), musician
 Rene Gagnon (1925–1979), U.S. Marine hero
 Robert Goulet (1933–2007), singer and actor
 Mike Gravel (1930–2021), politician, former U.S. Senator from Alaska (1969–1981), and 2008 Democratic presidential candidate
 Matt Groening (born 1954), cartoonist, writer, producer, animator, voice actor, and creator of The Simpsons
 Edwin S. Grosvenor, editor, publisher, nonprofit manager
 Gene Hackman (born 1930), retired actor and novelist
 Phil Hendrie (born 1952), radio personality and comedian
 Dwayne "The Rock" Johnson (born 1972), actor, semi-retired WWE wrestler, and producer
 Angelina Jolie (born 1975), actress, filmmaker, and humanitarian; one-quarter Canadian through her maternal grandfather
 Jack Kerouac (1922–1969), poet and writer
 Paul LePage (born 1948), 74th Governor of Maine (2011 to 2019)
 Stephanie Lemelin (born 1979), actress and animal rights activist; Canadian through her father
 Shirley MacLaine (born 1934), Hollywood actress and activist
 Josh Manson (born 1991), ice hockey player
 Joel McHale (born 1971), comedian, actor, writer, television producer, and television host
 Grace Metalious (1924–1964), author
 Walter Mondale (1928–2021), politician, 42nd vice president of the United States, and 1984 Democratic presidential nominee
 Elon Musk (born 1971 in Africa), inventor, engineer, owner of SpaceX, Tesla Motors, and SolarCity
 Tyler Myers (born 1990), ice hockey player
 Philip Nozuka, television actor
 Matthew Perry (born August 19, 1969) actor, best known for his role as Chandler Bing on the long-running NBC television sitcom Friends.
 S. M. Stirling (born September 30, 1953), French-born author whose father descends from Canada; well known for his Draka series and later his Nantucket series and Emberverse series
 Angus Sutherland (born 1982), producer, actor and paternal half-brother of Kiefer Sutherland
 Kiefer Sutherland (born 1966), actor, producer, director, and singer-songwriter
 Sarah Sutherland (born 1988), actress and daughter of Kiefer Sutherland
Jake Tapper (born 1969), journalist
 Robin Thicke (born 1977), R&B singer-songwriter
 Rudy Vallée (1901–1986), saxophone player
 Vince Vaughn (born 1970), actor
 Mark Wahlberg (born 1971), actor, and retired rapper
 David Woodard (born 1964), conductor and writer; one-half Canadian through his mother

Born in/lived in Canada, with American citizenship

 Howie Mandel (born 1955) comedian, television personality, screenwriter, actor, producer, director, entrepreneur, game show host, and author. 
 Patrick J. Adams (born 1981), actor, photographer and director
 Malin Åkerman (born 1978), actress and singer 
 James Naismith (November 6, 1861 – November 28, 1939), Inventor of Basketball as a Gym Professor in Springfield Illinois in 1891
 Foluke Akinradewo (born October 5, 1987), Volleyball player
 Stephen Amell (born 1981), actor best known for playing Oliver Queen, the title character in the TV series Arrow
 Pamela Anderson (born 1967), actress
 Paul Anka (born 1941), singer-songwriter and actor
 Will Arnett (born 1970), actor and comedian
 Dan Aykroyd (born 1952), actor and comedian
 Earl W. Bascom (1906–1995), rodeo pioneer, inventor, actor, artist/sculptor, hall of fame inductee, born in Utah and raised in Alberta, Canada
 David Baszucki (born 1963), entrepreneur, engineer, inventor, and co-founder and CEO of Roblox Corporation
 Eric Bauza (born 1979), comedian and voice actor
 Sugar Lyn Beard (born 1981), actress, voice actress, television personality, and former host of YTV's The Zone from 2001–2007
 Samantha Bee (born 1969), comedian, actress, writer, producer, political commentator, media critic and television host
 Alexander Graham Bell (1847–1922), Scottish-born inventor, scientist and engineer especially notable for inventing and patenting the first practical telephone; co-founded the American Telephone and Telegraph Company (AT&T) in 1885
 Manjul Bhargava (born 1974), Fields Medal winning mathematician at Princeton University
 Marty Biron (born 1977), ice hockey goaltender and commentator
 Paul Boyd (born 1976), reporter
 Len Blum (born 1951), screenwriter, film producer, and film composer
 Brett Boyko (born 1992), professional football player with the B.C. Lions
 Dayana Cadeau (born 1966), Haitian-born Canadian/American professional bodybuilder
 Jim Carrey (born 1962), comedian and actor
 Kim Cattrall (born 1956), British born Canadian-American actress, became an official U.S. citizen in 2020
Rae Dawn Chong (born 1961), actress and daughter of Tommy
 Tommy Chong (born 1938), comedian, actor, writer, director, activist, musician, and contestant from Dancing with the Stars season 19
 Emmanuelle Chriqui (born 1975), actress
 Kim Coates (born 1958), actor, Tig Trager from Sons of Anarchy
 Adam Cohen (born 1972), singer-songwriter, and son of Leonard
 Leonard Cohen (1934–2016), singer-songwriter, poet, and novelist
 Claire Corlett (born 1999), actress and singer, daughter of Ian James Corlett
 Ian James Corlett (born 1962), voice actor, musician, animator, and author providing voice work in both Vancouver and Los Angeles
 Nazneen Contractor (born 1982), Indian-born Canadian American actress most notable as Layla Hourani in The Border and Ruby in The Loud House
 Laura Creavalle (born 1959), Guyanese-born Canadian/American female professional bodybuilder
 Rafael Cruz (born 1939), Cuban-born Canadian/American Christian preacher and public speaker; father of Ted
 Ted Cruz (born 1970), politician, U.S. Senator from Texas since 2013, and 2016 Republican presidential candidate
 Ayesha Curry, actress and television personality
Brian Daboll (born 1975), head coach of the NFL's New York Giants since 2022
 Geoff Davis (born 1958), politician and former U.S. Representative from Kentucky (2005–2012)
 Trevor Devall (born 1972), voice actor and podcaster, migrated to Los Angeles since 2013
 Chris Diamantopoulos (born 1975), actor and comedian, best known for his role as Green Arrow in the Batman Unlimited series, Unicorn in Go Away, Unicorn! and Mickey Mouse in the eponymous TV series
 Michael Donovan (born 1953), voice actor and director for many animated series and feature films
 Marie Dressler (1868–1934), actress
 Feist (full name Leslie Feist) (born 1976), singer-songwriter known for her 2007 hit single "1234"
 Andrew Feustel (born 1965), NASA geophysicist
 Nathan Fillion (born 1970), actor
 Brent Fitz (born 1970), musician and multi-instrumentalist
 Dave Foley (born 1963), actor, stand-up comedian, director, producer, and writer working out of both Canada and America with dual citizenship
 Mike Foligno (born 1959), former professional ice hockey player and coach; currently a scout for the Vegas Golden Knights; father of Nick and Marcus Foligno
 Michael Fougere (born 1956), politician and Mayor of Regina, Saskatchewan since 2012
 David Foster (born 1949), singer and composer
 Michael J. Fox (born 1961), actor, author, producer, and advocate
 David Frum (born 1960), speechwriter and journalist
 John Garand, inventor of the M1 Garand rifle
 Victor Garber (born 1949), actor and singer
 Frank Gehry (born 1929), architect
 Drake (real name Aubrey Graham) (born 1986), rapper, singer-songwriter, and former actor
 Jennifer Granholm (born 1959), politician and former Governor of Michigan (2003–2011)
 Wayne Gretzky (born 1961), retired ice hockey player; considered the greatest ice hockey player of all time
 Bruce Greenwood (born 1956), actor and producer
 Jennifer Hale (born 1965), voice actress for various film and television series
 Winnie Harlow (born 1994), fashion model and public spokesperson on the skin condition vitiligo
 Bret Hart (born 1957), professional wrestler
 Owen Hart (1965–1999), professional wrestler
 Phil Hartman (1948–1998), actor, comedian, screenwriter, and graphic artist
 Tricia Helfer, (born 1974), actress* 
 Richard Conn Henry, (born 1940), astrophysicist
 Marieve Herington (born 1988), voice actress for various television films, anime, and series
 Sitara Hewitt (born 1981), actress
 Matt Hill (born 1968), comedian and voice actor for various television/cartoon series
 Jevon Holland (born 2000), American football safety for the Miami Dolphins
 Ernest "Tommy" Hughitt (born 1892, d. 1961), professional football player
 Chris Irvine (born 1970), professional wrestler known as Chris Jericho; lead singer of Fozzy
 Rick Jeanneret (born 1942), sportscaster. Jeanneret has full residency rights in the U.S. and identifies as Canadian-American; he has not made it clear whether or not he secured citizenship
 Peter Jennings (1938–2005), TV journalist and anchor for ABC
 Avan Jogia, Canadian-born actor raised in America
 Jason Jones (born 1973), actor and comedian known for The Daily Show with John Stewart
 Cory Joseph (born 1991), basketball player
 Stana Katic (born 1978), actress
 David Kaye (born 1962), actor most notable as Megatron in Beast Wars/Machines: Transformers, and in Transformers: Armada, Energon, and Cybertron
 Brittany Kennell (born 1987), singer and contestant from NBC's The Voice season 10
 Donnie Keshawarz (born 1969), actor
 Margot Kidder (1948–2018), actress and activist (father was American)
 James L. Kraft (1874–1953), entrepreneur known for being the first to patent processed cheese
 Chris Kunitz (born 1975), NHL ice hockey player
 Maurice LaMarche (born 1958), voice actor and comedian
 Rachelle Lefevre (born 1979), actress
 Ashley Leggat (born 1986), actress best known for her role as Casey McDonald from Life with Derek
 Mario Lemieux (born 1965), retired ice hockey player and current owner of the Pittsburgh Penguins
 Rejean Lemelin (born 1954), retired ice hockey goaltender and father of American actor, Stephanie Lemelin
 Stephanie Lemelin (born 1979), actress and animal rights activist; holding dual citizenship in Canada and the U.S.
 Sydney Leroux (born 1987), soccer player (father is American)
 Shin Lim (born 1991), magician and winner of America's Got Talent season 13
 Guy Lombardo (1902–1977), bandleader and violinist
 Erica Luttrell (born 1982), Canadian-born actor, although American through her father; returned to America in the early 2000s
 William Lyon Mackenzie (1795–1861), Scottish-born Canadian/American journalist, politician, and the 1st Mayor of Toronto
 Sean Patrick Maloney (born 1966), politician and U.S. Representative from New York since 2013
 Rizwan Manji (born 1974), actor
 Louis B. Mayer (1884–1957), film producer
 Eric McCormack (born 1963), actor, comedian, singer, voice actor
 Kevin McDonald (born 1961), Canadian-born actor, voice actor and comedian best known for his roles as Agent Wendy Pleakley in Lilo & Stitch franchise, Waffle in Catscratch, and Almighty Tallest Purple in Invader Zim
 Norm Macdonald (1959-2021), stand-up comedian, writer and actor notable as Norm the Genie in The Fairly OddParents
 Shawn Mendes (born 1998), singer-songwriter
 Burt Metcalfe (1935–2022), television and film producer, director, and writer
 Tate McRae (born 2003), singer, songwriter, dancer and actress
 Joni Mitchell (born 1943), singer-songwriter and painter
 Alanis Morissette (born 1974), singer-songwriter
 Kirby Morrow (1973–2020), actor and voice actor best known for voicing Hot Shot in Transformers: Cybertron and Miroku in the Inuyasha anime series.
 Caroline Mulroney (born 1974), Canadian lawyer and politician; Ontario's Minister of Francophone Affairs (2018–Present), Minister of Transportation (2019–Present) and Attorney General (2018–2019), Member of Provincial Parliament for York—Simcoe (2018–Present); daughter of 18th Prime Minister of Canada, Brian Mulroney; American citizenship by marriage to investment banker Andrew Lapham
 Elon Musk (born 1971), South African-born Canadian/American businessman, investor, engineer, and inventor; founder of Tesla Motors
 James E. Murray (1876–1961), politician and longtime U.S. Senator from Montana (1934–1961)
 Mike Myers (born 1963), Canadian-born British/American actor, comedian, screenwriter, and film producer
 Timothy Naftali (born 1962), historian
 James Naismith (1861–1939), inventor of basketball
 Leslie Nielsen (1926–2010), actor, comedian, and producer
 Justin Nozuka (born 1988), singer-songwriter
 Catherine O'Hara (born 1954), actress, writer and comedian
 Sandra Oh (born 1971), actress
 Marie Owens (1853–1927), first female police officer in the US and in the Chicago Police Department who enforced child labor and welfare laws
 Dustin Penner (born 1982), ice hockey player
 Frank Peppiatt (1927–2012), member of the variety show writing team Peppiatt and Aylesworth
 Mary Pickford, actress and film executive
 Jason Pominville (born 1982), ice hockey player with the Buffalo Sabres
 Jason Priestley (born 1969), actor and director
 James Randi (1928–2020), Toronto-born Canadian/American stage magician and scientific skeptic.
 David Reale (born 1985), actor, voice actor, and voice of Kai Hiwatari and Tsubasa Otori from the Beyblade anime series
 Leon Redbone (1949–2019), Cypriot-born Canadian-American singer
 Charles Revson (1906–1975) cosmetics pioneer, founder of Revlon
 Ryan Reynolds (born 1976), actor
 Caroline Rhea (born 1964), actor and comedian best known for her role as Hilda Spellman in Sabrina the Teenage Witch and Eugenia Scrimmage in the Bruno & Boots movie franchise
 Rino Romano (born 1969), actor
 Seth Rogen (born 1982), actor, comedian and filmmaker
 Jon Ryan (born 1981), professional football player with the Seattle Seahawks
 Joe Sakic (born 1969), retired hockey player and current general manager of the Colorado Avalanche
 Andrew Scheer (born 1979), politician, 35th Speaker of the House of Commons of Canada (2011–2015), former Leader of the Opposition (2017–2020) and Leader of the Conservative Party of Canada (2017–2020), Member of Parliament for Regina-Qu'Appelle (2004–Present), natural-born American citizen by descent from father
 Jack Scott (1936–2019), singer and songwriter
Drew Scott (born 1978), television personality; host of the various Property Brothers TV shows
Jonathan Scott (born 1978), television personality; host of the various Property Brothers TV shows
 Pablo Schreiber (born 1978), actor
 Mack Sennett (1880–1960), film director
 Patrick Sharp (born 1981), retired ice hockey player
 George Beverly Shea (1909–2013), gospel music singer-songwriter
 Martin Short (born 1950), actor, comedian, singer, voice actor
 Joe Shuster (1914–1992), comic book artist, co-creator of Superman
 Lilly Singh (born 1988), YouTuber, actress, and current judge on Canada's Got Talent
 Cobie Smulders, (born 1982), actress
 Hank Snow (1914–1999), country music singer-songwriter
 David Sobolov (born 1964), voice actor and director most notable for his role as Drax the Destroyer
 Paul Stastny (born 1985), ice hockey player with the Vegas Golden Knights
 Stan Stephens (1929–2021), politician, broadcaster, and former Governor of Montana (1989–1993)
 Geoff Stirling (1921–2013), broadcaster and eccentric (born in the then-independent Dominion of Newfoundland)
 Tara Strong (born 1973), voice actress for various film and television series
 Cree Summer (born 1969), voice actress for various film and television series, born in Los Angeles but raised in Toronto.
 Brad Swaile (born 1976), voice actor best known for roles such as Light Yagami from Death Note, and Kicker Jones from Transformers: Energon
 The Weeknd (real name Abel Tesfaye) (born 1990), singer-songwriter, record producer, and actor
 Daniel Thompson (1921–2015), inventor of the automatic bagel maker and the folding ping pong table
 Robert Tinkler (born 1973), voice actor best known for roles such as Brooklyn Masefield and Gingka Hagane from the Beyblade anime series, Lync Volan from Bakugan: New Vestroia, and Crimson Rubeus from the DIC Entertainment dub of Sailor Moon
 Alex Trebek (1940–2020), former long-time host of the game show Jeopardy! from 1984-2020
 Richard Verma (born 1968), politician and former U.S. Ambassador to India (2015–2017)
 Sam Vincent (born 1971), voice actor best known for roles such as Double D from Ed, Edd, n' Eddy, and the titular character from Martin Mystery
 Sugith Varughese, (born 1958), writer, director, and actor
 Jack L. Warner (1892–1978), film executive
 Harland Williams (born 1962), actor, comedian, author, artist, singer, musician, and radio personality
 Calum Worthy (born 1991), actor, writer, and producer most notable as Dez on Austin & Ally
 Katheryn Winnick (born 1977), actress and director 
 Fay Wray (born 1907), actor and author, Wray became a naturalized American citizen in 1933
 Jason Wu (born 1982), Taiwanese-born Canadian/American fashion designer; dress designer of former First Lady Michelle Obama
 Baruch Frydman-Kohl, Canadian-American who serves as the Rabbi Emeritus of Beth Tzedec Congregation. In 2022, he was appointed as a Member of the Order of Canada.

References

 
American
Canadian
Canadian